Px27 is a class of Polish State Railways (PKP)  narrow-gauge steam locomotive built by Fablok in Chrzanów, Poland, in 1929 (factory type W5A). Only two locomotives of this class were made, and one, Px27-775, is currently preserved.

History 
In 1927 Wyrzysk County Railways (Wyrzyskie Koleje Powiatowe) ordered two locomotives in the First Locomotive Factory in Poland (Fablok), fit for service on sloping line profile. Fablok designed and manufactured two W5A type locomotives in 1929. After 1961 these were designated as PKP class Px27. It was a D locomotive with a two-axle tender. The design based upon Fablok's earlier W2A type tank locomotive (later Tx26-427). Only after nine years, in 1938 the third and last slightly differing locomotive of W5A type was ordered by other railway (it was later designed as Px38 class). 

Both locomotives, factory numbers 343 and 344, received stock numbers 25 and 26 respectively and stationed in Białośliwie depot. Both survived World War II, working on their railway. After the war, all county railways were taken over by the Polish State Railways (PKP) and in 1947 the locomotives were included into PKP Px2 collective class and given numbers Px2-801 (ex 26) and 802 (ex 25). According to new regulations, in 1961 both locomotives were classified as Px27 class, being the only ones in this class (P - locomotive with a tender, x - D axle arrangement, 27 – Polish origin locomotive designed in 1927). Px2-801 (factory no. 344) was renamed Px27-774, and Px2-802 (factory no. 343) was renamed Px27-775. 

After World War II both locomotives worked still on Bydgoszcz-Wyrzysk railway, basing in Białośliwie. Px27-774 was retired on 26 September 1970, and then scrapped. Px 27-775 worked until 1976, then it was given to Narrow Gauge Railway Museum in Wenecja, as a cold exhibit. (It might be noted, that also Px38-805 of W5A type is preserved in Wenecja).

References

.

See also
Narrow-gauge railways in Poland

External links 
 Px27-775 - Wciąż pod parą Additional photographs and information (Polish)

Narrow gauge steam locomotives of Poland
Preserved steam locomotives of Poland
Polish State Railways steam locomotives
600 mm gauge railway locomotives
0-8-0 locomotives